This is a list of notable people who studied at Saint Martin's School of Art from its foundation in 1854 up to the time of its amalgamation with the Central School of Art and Design in 1989.

A
 Alan Aboud
 Ruth Abrahams
 Jane Ackroyd
 Sade Adu
 Maurice Agis
 Joe Allen (painter)
 Martin Asbury
 Michael "Atters" Attree
 Mabel Lucie Attwell
 Frank Auerbach

B
 Jeff Banks
 Jonathan Barnbrook
 Lionel Bart
 Pauline Baumann
 Cressida Bell
 Zadok Ben-David
 Simon Bill
 Sandra Blow
 Brian Bourke
 Hamish Bowles
 Helene Brandt
 Nick Brandt
 Roland Brener
 Pierce Brosnan
 Robert Buhler
 John Bunting (sculptor)
 Jim Burns
 James Butler (artist)

C
 Mel Calman
 Stephen Cartwright
 Billy Childish
 Alison Chitty
 William Constable (designer)
 Richard Cook (painter born 1947)
 Cressida Cowell
 Roderick Coyne
 Jack Crabtree (artist)
 Edward Cronshaw
 Stan Cross
 Stephen Chambers

D
 Dexter Dalwood
 Richard Deacon (sculptor)
 Len Deighton
 Braco Dimitrijević
 Peter Doig
 Eric Doitch
 Arthur Dooley
 Barry Driscoll
 Violet Hilda Drummond, author and illustrator
 William Dudley (designer)
 Keanan Duffty
 Brian Duffy (photographer)

E
 Benni Efrat
 Afi Ekong
 Clifford Ellis
 John Ernest

F
 Mick Farren
 Micheal Farrell
 Stephen Farthing
 Sheila Fell
 Ronald Ferns
 Michael ffolkes
 Tim Flach
 Barry Flanagan
 Dennis Flanders
 Eva Frankfurther
 Barnett Freedman
 Hamish Fulton

G
 George Gale (cartoonist)
 Abram Games
 Dudu Gerstein
 Bill Gibb
 Gilbert & George
 Darla Jane Gilroy
 Sybil Mullen Glover
 Antony Gormley
 Andrew Grassie
 Pamela Green
 Carla Guelfenbein

H
 Francesca von Habsburg
 Z'ev ben Shimon Halevi
 Donald Hamilton Fraser
 Richard Hamilton (artist)
 Katharine Hamnett
 Naeem Haq
 Tony Harding
 David Harrison (artist)
 Tim Head
 Gerard Hemsworth
 Nicholas Hely Hutchinson
 Lynette Hemmant
 Albert Herbert
 Richard Heslop
 Peter Hide
 John Hilliard (artist)
 Bobby Hillson
 Paul Hogarth
 Ruth Horam
 Albert Houthuesen
 Barbara Howard (artist)
 John Hurt

I
 Bryan Ingham

J
 Chaz Jankel
 Catherine Johnson (novelist)
 Janet and Anne Grahame Johnstone
 Dylan Jones
 Joy Farrall Jones
 Stephen Jones (milliner)
 Isaac Julien

K
 Menashe Kadishman
 Phillip King (artist)
 Linda Kitson
 Leon Kossoff

L
 Gerald Laing
 Peter Lasko
 Amanda Lear
 Doris Lindner
 Julia Lockheart
 Richard Long (artist)

M
 Anne Magill
 Edna Manley
 Frank Marcus
 Glen Matlock
 Bruce McLean
 Margaret Mee
 Kobena Mercer
 Ian Miller (illustrator)
 Lisa Milroy
 Richard G. Mitchell
 Bruno Monguzzi
 Henry Moon
 Mona Moore

O
 Bruce Oldfield
 Olly and Suzi
 Thérèse Oulton
 Rifat Özbek

P
 Jenny Packham
 Eduardo Paolozzi
 George Passmore (sculptor)
 Dave Pearson (painter)
 Charles Peattie
 A. R. Philpott
 Carl Plate
 Platon (photographer)
 Sandy Powell (costume designer)
 Matt Pritchett
 Gilbert Prousch
 The Puppini Sisters
 Stephen Pusey

R
 Shani Rhys James
 Lancelot Ribeiro
 Paul Richards (artist)
 Ray Richardson (artist)
 Philip Ridley
 William Roberts (painter)
 Ron Robertson-Swann
 Claudia Roden
 Meg Rosoff
 Frank Runacres
 Craig Richards (DJ)

S
 Elisabeth Sakellariou
 Rashad Salim
 Philip Sallon
 Mangala Samaraweera
 Gerald Scarfe
 Buky Schwartz
 Tim Scott (artist)
 Nick Sharratt
 Jack Smith (artist)
 Kenneth Snowman
 Carole Steyn

T
 Patrick Thomas (graphic artist)
 Frank Tovey
 William G. Tucker
Yoko Terauchi

V
 Paul Vanstone

W
 Hanna Weil
 Sophia Wellbeloved
 John Wells (artist)
 Jim Whiting
 Isaac Witkin
 Carol Wyatt
 Cerith Wyn Evans

Y
 Emily Young

Z
 Philip Zec

References

Saint Martin's School of Art